

Discjockey 

Pierre started out as a DJ 1989 in Gothenburg but became famous in Sweden when he participated in DMC DJ Championship and ended up as number 2 in Sweden and Europe and the following year was number 1 in Sweden and number 5  in the DMC World DJ Championship.

Pierre J 

During the 90s he produced and remixed artist like Dr Alban, E-Type, Eric Gadd, Meja, Emilia, Adolphson & Falk, Melodie MC Featuring Jocelyn Brown, Fatima Rainey, Clubland, Alexia & Tellus on over 200 records. Constantly nominated as best producer and remixer  in Sweden.

Radio and Television 

The career as host on National Radio P3 started. During 15 years you could hear him on shows like P3 Mix, P3 Remix, P3 Klubb and P3 Dans  until the year 2011.
He also wrote music to the programs Fotbollskväll, Hockeykväll, Packat & Klart and Trafikmagasinet that were broadcast on National Swedish Television, SVT.

Hertz 

The greater part of the 2000s has been devoted to his own record labels Sway, Q-Records, Abyss Records, Atom, M4M, Hz Trax and his alias Hertz. Pierres been releasing on many established labels such as Defected, Toolroom Records, Underwater Records, Drumcode, Recycled Loops, Craft Music, Tresor, Virgin & Universal. He also done many events and festivals around Europe, among those at Dance Valley, Awakenings, Fabrik, Florida 135, Le Zenith & The Matrixx.

References

External links
 
 https://www.discogs.com/artist/37037-Pierre-J
 https://www.discogs.com/artist/12827-Hertz
 http://defected.com/video/314/uberfett-el-zoomah-full-length-2008/

1972 births
Living people
Swedish DJs
Electronic dance music DJs